Liliesleaf Farm is a location in northern Johannesburg, South Africa, which is most noted for its use as a safe house for African National Congress activists in the 1960s. In 1963, the South African police raided the farm, arresting more than a dozen ANC leaders and activists, who were then tried and prosecuted during the Rivonia Trial. Since the end of apartheid, the area has been turned into a museum and heritage site.

History
The farmhouse is located in Rivonia, a suburb outside Johannesburg. In 1961, the property was purchased by Arthur Goldreich and Harold Wolpe to use as the headquarters for the underground South African Communist Party and a safe house for political fugitives. African National Congress leader Nelson Mandela needed a safe place from which to operate, and lived there under the assumed name of David Motsamayi, a farmer hired to work on the farm.

On 11 July 1963, security police raided the farm and arrested 19 members of the underground, later charging and prosecuting a number of them with sabotage. The police had learned of the location from two sources: George Mellis, who lived nearby in the Rivonia Caravan Park, noticed a number of cars going in and out of the farm area and told his family; and a police informant in the uMkhonto we Sizwe, the ANC's armed wing. The activists had been meeting in the thatched room and were surprised by the raid. They had already decided beforehand to move to another safe house, with 11 July being their last meeting at Liliesleaf. Nelson Mandela was already in prison, serving a sentence of five years for leaving the country illegally, having been arrested the previous year. The police found documents during the raid that had been hidden in a coal bunker incriminating Mandela. As a result, he was charged and brought to trial with the others.

The trial, which ran from October 1963 to June 1964, ended with Mandela and seven others found guilty and sentenced to life imprisonment.

After apartheid 

The farmhouse at Liliesleaf Farm has now been surrounded by the gradual spread of Johannesburg's suburbs, but the historic site has been reopened to visitors. The buildings have been restored to their earlier condition, and visual and audio-visual displays recreate the dramatic events leading up to the police raid, and the raid itself.

The farm is referred to either as "Liliesleaf" or "Lilliesleaf", with the former spelling used at the site itself.

References

Further reading

 Liliesleaf Farm Trust
 Rivonia Trial 1963-1964 (SA History Online)

External links
Liliesleaf

Opposition to apartheid in South Africa
Apartheid museums
Defunct museums
Impact of the COVID-19 pandemic on the arts and cultural heritage